Anadia marmorata, the spotted anadia, is a species of lizard in the family Gymnophthalmidae. It is endemic to Venezuela.

References

Anadia (genus)
Reptiles described in 1846
Taxa named by John Edward Gray